The Michigan Open is the Michigan state open golf tournament, open to both amateur and professional golfers. It is organized by the Michigan section of the PGA of America. It has been played annually since 1916 at a variety of courses around the state.

Winners

2022 Jake Kneen
2021 Bradley Smithson (amateur)
2020 Brett White
2019 Eric Lilleboe
2018 Jake Kneen (amateur)
2017 Matt Thompson
2016 Jeff Bronkema
2015 Jeff Cuzzort
2014 Ryan Brehm
2013 Tom Werkmeister (amateur)
2012 Barrett Kelpin
2011 Randy Hutchison
2010 Ryan Brehm
2009 Ryan Brehm
2008 Tom Gillis
2007 Andrew Ruthkoski
2006 Scott Hebert
2005 Michael Harris
2004 Jeff Roth
2003 Bob Ackerman
2002 Scott Hebert
2001 Scott Hebert
2000 Scott Hebert
1999 Scott Hebert
1998 Jeff Roth
1997 Scott Hebert
1996 Steve Brady
1995 Dave Smith
1994 Tom Gillis
1993 Brent Veenstra
1992 Steve Brady
1991 Steve Brady
1990 Robert Proben
1989 Barry Redmond
1988 Ed Humenik
1987 Jack Seltzer
1986 Tim Matthews
1985 Randy Erskine
1984 Randy Erskine
1983 Buddy Whitten
1982 Buddy Whitten
1981 Fred Muller
1980 Lynn Janson
1979 Randy Erskine
1978 Randy Erskine
1977 Tom Deaton
1976 Randy Erskine
1975 Bob Ackerman III (amateur)
1974 Lynn Janson
1973 George Bayer
1972 Ron Fox
1971 Ted Kondratko
1970 Walter Burkemo
1969 Charles Knowles
1968 John Molenda
1967 Mike Souchak
1966 Gene Bone
1965 Gene Bone
1964 Thom Rosely
1963 Phil Wiechman
1962 Pete Brown
1961 John Barnum
1960 John Barnum
1959 Dave Hill
1958 John Barnum
1957 Walter Burkemo
1956 Pete Cooper
1955 Walter Burkemo
1954 Horton Smith
1953 Chick Harbert
1952 Mike Dietz
1951 Walter Burkemo
1950 John Barnum
1949 Al Watrous
1948 Chick Harbert
1947 Buck White
1946 Chuck Kocsis (amateur)
1945 Chuck Kocsis (amateur)
1944 Sam Byrd
1943 Al Watrous
1942 Chick Harbert
1941 Gib Sellers
1940 Emerick Kocsis
1939 Marvin Stahl
1938 Marvin Stahl
1937 Chick Harbert (amateur)
1936 Marvin Stahl
1935 Jake Fassezke
1934 Jake Fassezke
1933 Mortie Dutra
1932 Clarence Gamber
1931 Chuck Kocsis (amateur)
1930 Al Watrous
1929 Al Watrous
1928 George Von Elm (amateur)
1927 Al Watrous
1926 Al Watrous
1925 Davey Robertson
1924 No record
1923 Harry Hampton
1922 No record
1921 Walter Hagen
1920 Mike Brady
1919 Leo Diegel
1917-18 No tournament
1916 Leo Diegel

External links
PGA of America – Michigan section
List of winners

Golf in Michigan
PGA of America sectional tournaments
State Open golf tournaments
Recurring sporting events established in 1916
1916 establishments in Michigan